Indian rodeo is the rodeo subculture of Native American rodeo athletes and, in Canada, First Nations athletes. In the United States there are a number of regional associations and at least two national finals. In Canada, Indian rodeos share a major role in small aboriginal communities and are also featured events in larger centres with aboriginal populations. Some major rodeos in British Columbia such as the Williams Lake Stampede are, while not aboriginally-organized and unlike some Indian rodeos open to non-natives, heavily "Indian" in character and in the ranks of competitors. The Indian rodeo is sponsored by a few well known companies including the Boot Barn, Cooper Tires and Yeti.

Indian rodeos in the United States 

The Indian National Finals Rodeo (INFR)
The All Indian Rodeo Cowboys Association operates in Arizona and neighboring southwestern states.

Indian rodeos in Canada
Lillooet Lake Rodeo, Mount Currie, British Columbia
Anahim Lake Stampede, or Anahim Lake Rodeo, Anahim Lake, British Columbia
Nazko Jamboree, Nazko, British Columbia

Indian rodeo halls of fame in the United States 
 Indian National Finals Rodeo Hall of Fame

References

External links
 2019 Indian National Finals Rodeo
 Indian National Finals Rodeo
 All Indian Rodeo Cowboys Association
 Indianrodeonews.com (archive)
 Pro Rodeo Online - Indian Rodeo
 Indian Rodeo, documentary produced by Wyoming PBS

Native American culture
First Nations culture
Rodeo in the United States
Rodeo in Canada
Native American sports and games
Equestrian sports in Canada
Equestrian sports in the United States